is a mountain on the border of Yabu, Hyōgo Prefecture, and Wakasa, Tottori Prefecture, in Japan. It is the highest mountain in Hyōgo Prefecture. This mountain is one of the 200 famous mountains in Japan. Other names of this mountain are Suga-no-sen, Hyō-zan, Hyō-no-yama, Kōri-no-yama.

Outline 
Mount Hyōno is estimated as an upheaved submarine volcano which erupted 3 million years ago with Mount Naki and Torokawa-daira highland. This mountain is the second highest mountain in Chūgoku Mountains, and also the second highest in Honshū west of Osaka Prefecture. This mountain is in the Hyōnosen-Ushiroyama-Nagisan Quasi-National Park. This mountain is also selected as one of the 100 untrodden areas in Japan.

Access 
 Fukusada Bus Stop of Zentan Bus.

Gallery

See also
 The 100 Views of Nature in Kansai

References
 Ministry of Environment of Japan
 Official Home Page of the Geographical Survey Institute in Japan

Hyono
Hyono